The Ohio Collaborative is a twelve-person panel in Ohio that establishes statewide standards for law enforcement agencies.  The result of recommendations from a task force created by Ohio Governor John Kasich, the Ohio Collaborative is co-chaired by Director of Public Safety John Born and former Ohio Senator Nina Turner.  Other members of the collaborative include representatives from law enforcement, community members, and legislators.

The Ohio Collaborative's initial recommendations were on guidelines for use of force and employee recruitment.  The panel has since published standards on bias free policing, body worn cameras, community engagement, and telecommunicator training.

The recommendations put forth by the Ohio Collaborative are not compulsory.  Agencies that choose to comply with the guidelines are considered to be "certified" by the Collaborative, are issued certificates, and are listed on the Ohio Collaborative website.

Panel members
There are 12 members on the Ohio Collaborative:
 John Born, Ohio Director of Public Safety, Co-Chiar
 Nina Turner, former Ohio Senator, Co-Chair
 Brian Armstead, Sergeant, Akron Police Department
 Lori Barreras, Ohio Civil Rights Commission
 Ronnie Dunn, Associate Professor, Cleveland State University
 Austin B. Harris, Student, Central State University
 Michael H. Keenan, City Councilman, Dublin, Ohio
 Damon Lynch III, Senior Pastor
 Tom Miller, Sheriff, Medina County
 Michael J. Navarre, Chief of Police, Oregon PD
 Ronald J. O’Brien, Franklin County Prosecutor

Certified agencies 
Of 831 law enforcement agencies in Ohio, 329 are certified by the Ohio Collaborative:

 Ada Police Department
 Akron Police Department
 Allen County Sheriff's Office
 Amelia Police Department
 Amherst Police Department
 American Township Police Department
 Andover Police Department
 Ansonia Police Department
 Ashland County Sheriff's Office
 Ashland Police Department
 Athens City Police Department
 Athens County Sheriff's Office
 Auglaize County Sheriff's Office
 Aurora Police Department
 Austintown Police Department
 Avon Lake Police Department
 Avon Police Department
 Barberton Police Department
 Bath Township Police Department
 Bay View Police Department
 Bazetta Township Police Department
 Beachwood Police Department
 Beavercreek Police Department
 Beaver Police Department
 Bellbrook Police Department
 Bellefontaine Police Department
 Bellevue Police Department
 Belmont County Sheriff's Office
 Bethel Police Department
 Bexley Police Department
 Blue Ash Police Department
 Boston Heights Police Department
 Bowling Green Police Department
 Bowling Green State University Police Department
 Brimfield Police Department
 Broadview Heights Police Department
 Brookville Police Department
 Brown County Sheriff's Office
 Brunswick Division of Police
 Bucyrus Police Department
 Butler County Sheriff's Office
 Butler Township Police Department
 Cambridge Police Department
 Canal Fulton Police Department
 Canfield Police Department
 Canton Police Department
 Carroll County Sheriff's Office
 Carroll Township Police Department
 Centerville Police Department
 Chagrin Falls Police Department
 Champaign County Sheriff's Office
 Cincinnati State Technical and Community College
 Cincinnati Police Department
 Circleville Police Department
 Clark County Sheriff's Office
 Clayton Police Department
 Clay Township Police Department
 Clearcreek Township Police Department
 Clermont County Sheriff's Office
 Cleveland Heights Police Department
 Cleveland Metroparks Ranger Department
 Cleveland State University Police Department
 Clinton County Sheriff's Office
 Coldwater Police Department
 Colerain Police Department
 Columbiana County Sheriff's Office
 Columbus Airport Police Department
 Columbus Police Department
 Columbus State Community College Police Department
 Copley Township Police Department
 Covington Police Department
 Cuyahoga Falls Police Department
 Cuyahoga Heights Police Department
 Cuyahoga Metropolitan Housing Authority Police Department
 Danbury Police Department
 Darke County Sheriff's Office
 Dayton International Airport Police Division
 Dayton Police Department
 Defiance County Sheriff's Office
 Delaware County Sheriff's Office
 Delhi Police Department
 East Cleveland Police Department
 Eastlake Police Department
 Eaton Police Department
 Elida Police Department
 Elmore Police Department
 Elyria Police Department 
 Erie County Sheriff's Office
 Euclid Police Department
 Evendale Police Department
 Fairborn Police Department
 Fairfield Police Department
 Fairlawn Police Department
 Fayette County Sheriff's Office
 Findlay Police Department
 Forest Park Police Department
 Fostoria Police Department
 Franklin County Metro Parks
 Fredericktown Police Department
 Fremont Police Department
 Fulton County Sheriff's Office
 Gahanna Police Department
 Garfield Heights Police Department
 Gates Mills Police Department
 Geauga County Sheriff's Office
 Genoa Police Department
 Genoa Township Police Department
 German Township Police Department
 Gnadenhutten Police Department
 Goshen Township Police Department
 Grafton Police Department
 Grandview Medical Center Police Department

 Granville Police Department
 Great Parks of Hamilton County Ranger Department
 Greene County Sheriff's Office
 Green Hills Police Department
 Green Township Police Department
 Greenville Police Department
 Guernsey County Sheriff's Office
 Hamilton Police Department
 Hardin County Sheriff's Office
 Harrison County Sheriff's Office
 Harrison Police Department
 Hebron Police Department
 Highland County Sheriff's Office
 Highland Heights Police Department
 Hills & Dales Police Department
 Hocking College Police Department
 Hocking County Sheriff's Office
 Holmes County Sheriff's Office
 Howland Township Police Department
 Hubbard Police Department
 Hubbard Township Police Department
 Huber Heights Police Department
 Hudson Police Department
 Hunting Valley Police Department
 Huron County Sheriff's Office
 Indian Hill Rangers
 Jackson Police Department
 Jackson Township Police Department (Montgomery County)
 Jackson Township Police Department (Stark County)
 Johnstown Police Department
 Kent State University Police Department
 Kettering Police Department
 Kirtland Hills Police Department
 Knox County Sheriff's Office
 Lakewood Police Department
 Lake County Sheriff's Office
 Lakeland College Police Department
 Lancaster Police Department
 Lebanon Police Department
 Lexington Police Department
 Liberty Township Police Department (Trumbull County)
 Licking County Sheriff's Office
 Lockland Police Department
 Logan County Sheriff's Office
 Logan Police Department
 London Police Department
 Lorain County Sheriff's Office
 Lorain Police Department
 Louisville Police Department
 Loveland Police Department
 Madison Township Police Department
 Mahoning County Sheriff's Office
 Mansfield Police Department
 Mariemont Police Department
 Marietta Police Department
 Marion County Sheriff's Office
 Marion Township Police Department
 Marysville Police Department
 Massillon Police Department
 Maumee Police Department
 Mayfield Heights Police Department
 McDonald Police Department
 Mechanicsburg Police Department
 Medina County Sheriff's Office
 Medina Police Department
 Medina Township Police Department
 Medway Drug Enforcement Agency (Wayne County)
 Mentor-on-the-Lake Police Department
 Miami County Park District
 Miamisburg Police Department
 Mercer County Sheriff's Office
 Miami Township Police Department
 Miami University Police Department
 Middleburg Heights Police Department
 Milan Police Department
 Milford Police Department
 Mill Creek Metro Parks Police Department
 Millersburg Police Department
 Minerva Park Police Department
 Mogadore Police Department
 Montgomery County Sheriff's Office
 Montgomery Police Department
 Montipelier Police Department
 Montville Township Police Department
 Morrow County Sheriff's Office
 Mount Healthy Police Department
 Muskingum County Sheriff's Office
 Napoleon Police Department
 Newark Division of Police
 New Bremen Police Department
 Newburgh Police Department
 New Knoxville Police Department
 New Franklin Police Department
 New Lexington Police Department
 New London Police Department
 New Middletown Police Department
 Newtown Police Department
 Newtonsville Police Department
 Niles Police Department
 North Canton Police Department
 Northeast Ohio Medical University Police Department
 North Olmstead Police Department
 North Ridgeville Police Department
 Northwood Police Department
 Norton Police Department
 Norwood Police Department
 Notre Dame College Police Department
 Oak Harbor Police Department
 Oakwood Public Safety Department
 Ohio University Police Department
 Ohio State University Police Department
 Ohio Veterans Homes Police Department

 Olmsted Township Police Department
 Ontario Police Department
 Oregon Police Department
 Ottawa County Sheriff's Office
 Ottawa Hills Police Department
 Otterbein Police Department
 Owens State Community College Police Department
 Oxford Division of Police
 Oxford Township Police Department
 Painesville Police Department
 Parma Heights Police Department
 Pepper Pike Police Department
 Perkins Township Police Department
 Perry Police Department
 Perry Township Police Department
 Pierce Township Police Department
 Pickaway County Sheriff's Office
 Piqua Police Department
 Plain City Police Department
 Port Clinton Police Department
 Powell Police Department
 Preble County Sheriff's Office
 Putnam County Sheriff's Office
 Reading Police Department
 Richland County Sheriff's Office
 Richmond Heights Police Department
 Rittman Police Department (Medina County)
 Rittman Police Department (Wayne County)
 Rocky River Police Department
 Russells Point Police Department
 Sagamore Hills Police Department
 Salem Township Police Department
 Sandusky Police Department
 Seven Hills Police Department
 Shaker Heights Police Department
 Sharon Township Police Department
 Sharonville Police Department
 Shawnee Hills Police Department
 Shawnee State University Department of Public Safety
 Shawnee Township Police Department
 Sheffield Village Police Department
 Shelby Police Department
 Sidney Police Department
 Sinclair Community College Police Department
 Solon Police Department
 Somerset Police Department
 Springboro Police Department
 Springdale Police Department
 Springfield Police Division
 Springfield Township Police Department
 Stow Police Department
 Stark County Sheriff's Office
 Streetsboro Police Department
 Strongsville Police Department
 Sugarcreek Police Department
 Summa Health System Protective Services
 Summit County Sheriff's Office
 Sidney Parks Department
 Tallmadge Police Department
 Terrace Park Police Department
 Tiffin Police Department
 Tipp City Police Department
 Toledo Police Department
 Trotwood Police Department
 Troy Police Department
 Twinsburg Police Department
 Union County Sheriff's Office
 Uniontown Police Department
 University Circle Police Department
 University of Akron Police Department
 University of Cincinnati Department of Public Safety
 University of Rio Grande Police Department
 University of Toledo Police Department
 Upper Arlington Police Department
 Vandalia Police Department
 Van Wert County Sheriff's Office
 Vermillion Police Department
 Village of Addyston Police Department
 Village of Owensville Police Department
 Village of St. Bernard Police Department
 Wadsworth Police Department
 Waite Hill Police Department
 Walton Hills Police Department
 Warren County Sheriff's Office
 Warren Township Police Department
 Washington County Sheriff's Office
 Waterville Township Police Department
 Wauseon Police Department
 Wayne Police Department
 Waynesfield Police Department
 Weathersfield Township Police Department
 West Carrollton Police Department
 West Chester Police Department
 West Lafayette Police Department
 Westerville Police Department
 Westlake Police Department
 West Liberty Police Department
 Whitehall Police Department
 Whitehouse Police Department
 Wickliffe Police Department
 Williamsburg Police Department
 Wilmington Police Department
 Willoughby Hills Police Department
 Willoughby Police Department
 Willowick Police Department
 Wood County Sheriff's Office
 Woodlawn Police Division
 Wooster Police Department
 Worthington Police Department
 Wyoming Police Department
 Xenia Police Department
 Zanesville Police Department

References 

Law enforcement in Ohio